The Inca society was the society of the Inca civilization in Peru. The Inca Empire, which lasted from 1438 to 1533 A.D., represented the height of this civilization. The Inca state was known as the Kingdom of Cusco before 1438. Over the course of the empire, the rulers used conquest and peaceful assimilation to incorporate a large portion of western South America, centered on the Andes mountain ranges. The empire proved relatively short-lived however: by 1533, Atahualpa, the last Sapa Inca (emperor) of the Inca Empire, was killed on the orders of the conquistador Francisco Pizarro, marking the beginning of Spanish rule. The last Inca stronghold, the Neo-Inca State in Vilcabamba, was conquered by the Spanish in 1572.

Population

Population estimates for the Tawantinsuyu society range from as few as 4.1 million people to more than 36 million. Most estimates are between 6 and 14 million people. The reason for these various estimates is that, while the Inca kept excellent census records using their quipus, knowledge of how to read them has been lost. Almost all of them were destroyed by the Spanish in the course of their conquest and rule.

Marriage
Women and men had parallel roles, but were separate in Inca society. They were equally valued for the part they played in their society despite their differing roles. Marriage was no different.

Inca women were typically married at the age of sixteen, while men married at the age of twenty. Age, however, was not as important as keeping track of the stage of life that a person was at, such as whether or not they were able to work or be married. Ranks played a role in a person's marriage status as well. Men of lower rank could only have one wife; people of higher ranks than the kuraka were allowed more. If a man had more than one wife, one served as the principal wife while the others were considered secondary. Having more wives showed that the man had more labor showing that the household was wealthy. The death of the principal wife was sometimes met with the suspicion that the husband played a role in her death. The man had to find a new principal wife before he was able to recover from the previous wife's death. To prevent such suspicion and to increase the likelihood of a successful marriage, there were situations in which the couple could test how well the marriage would work out.

Trial marriages were typical of Inca culture. In this type of marriage, the man and woman would agree to try out being married to one another for a few years. At the end of this time, the woman could go home to her parents if she wished and her husband could also send her home if he did not think it would work out. However, once the marriage was made final, they could only divorce if the woman was childless. To make the marriage final, the provincial governor had to approve the union.

In the Incan society, a wedding wasn't a simple event.  Instead, it was looked at more as a business-like agreement. Therefore, marriage was an economic agreement between two families. Parents on either side had to come to an agreement before the marriage took place and the couple could not be directly related to one another. Women would almost always marry men in the same social class as themselves. However, while it was very rare for them to marry a man with a higher social ranking, it was still possible for some young women. The only way for a young woman to alter her social ranking would be if a man of higher ranking took notice of her. 

Once a woman was married, she was expected to collect food and cook, watch over the animals and the children and supply cloth to the government. Women of higher ranking also weaved, like those of lower ranks, but their work was used in special clothing for the higher ranks. A man's role sometimes resembled that of a woman, but acted in conjunction with one another. A woman’s household obligations would not change after she became pregnant. When she did find out she was pregnant she prayed and made offerings to an Inca god, Kanopa. Using marriage as an alliance strategy was also common among the Inca. Even before the Spaniards' arrival, the Inca used marriage as a way to claim themselves to power. After the Spaniards arrival the Inca allowed marriages between the Inca and Spaniards to gain power during a time of civil war.

The Incas were a conquering society and their expansionist assimilation of other cultures is evident in their artistic style. The artistic style of the Inca utilized the vocabulary of many regions and cultures but incorporated these themes into a standardized imperial style that could easily be replicated and spread throughout the empire. The simple abstract geometric forms and highly stylized animal representation in:ceramics, wood carvings, textiles and metalwork were all part of the Inca culture. The motifs were not as revivalist as previous empires. No motifs of other societies were directly used except Huari and Tiwanaku arts.

Shipbuilding

For fishing, trade, construction, transport and military purposes, the Inca built seagoing vessels called balsas by weaving together totora reeds. The largest of these vessels were 20 to 30 meters long/787 inches to 1181 inches, making them comparable in length to the Spanish caravel. This method of constructing ships from woven reeds is an ancient Peruvian tradition which long predates the Inca. There are depictions of such vessels in Moche pottery dating back to 100 A.D.

Clothing

Inca officials wore stylized tunics that indicated their status. It contains an amalgamation of motifs used in the tunics of particular officeholders. For instance, the black and white checkerboard pattern topped with a pink triangle is believed to have been worn by soldiers of the army. Some of the motifs refer to earlier cultures, such as the stepped diamonds of the Huari and the three-step stairstep motif of the Moche.

The cloth was divided into three classes. Alaska was used for household use and usually made from llama wool. Finer cloth, quipu, was divided into two classes:the first, woven by male qunpikamayuq (keepers of fine cloth) from alpaca wool, was collected as tribute from throughout the country and was used for trade. The other class of quipu ranked highest. It was woven in the Acllawasi (acllahuasi) by "called" (female virgins of the sun god temple) from vicuña wool and used solely for royal and religious use. These had thread counts of 300 or more per inch, unsurpassed anywhere in the world, until the Industrial Revolution of the 19th century.

Aside from the tunic, a person of importance wore a llawt'u, a series of cords wrapped around the head. To establish his importance, the Inca Atahualpa commissioned a llawt'u woven from vampire bat hair. The leader of each ayllu, or extended family, had its own headdress.

In conquered regions, traditional clothing continued to be worn, but the finest weavers, such as those of Chan Chan, were transferred to Cusco and kept there to weave quips (the Chimú had previously transferred these same weavers to Chan Chan from Sican). The farmers were the most important people in the Inca empire, though they were at the bottom of the social class.

Jewelry
The wearing of jewelry was not uniform throughout Peru. Chimú artisans, for example, continued to wear earrings after their integration into the empire, but in many other regions, usually, only local leaders wore them. Jewelry may have been common among the Inca people, however it did not hold as much value to them because labor was the main way people paid each other.

Ceramics and metalwork

Ceramics were for the most part utilitarian in nature but also incorporated the imperialist style that was prevalent in the Inca textiles and metalwork. In addition, the Inca played drums and on woodwind instruments including flutes, pan-pipes and trumpets made of shell and ceramics.

The Inca made beautiful objects of:gold, silver, copper, bronze and tumbaga. But precious metals were in shorter supply than in earlier Peruvian cultures. The Inca metalworking style draws much of its inspiration from Chimú art and, in fact, the best metal workers of Chan Chan were transferred to Cusco when the Kingdom of Chimor was incorporated into the empire. Unlike the Chimú, the Inca do not seem to have regarded metals to be as precious as fine cloth. Nonetheless, the metalworks of the Incas were perhaps the most advanced in America. When the Spanish first encountered the Inca they were offered gifts of quips cloth.

Incan ceramics are usually very distinct and easy to recognize. The shapes of the vessels are highly standardized. The most typical Incan pottery would have a spherical body with a cone-shaped base. This spherical body usually includes two vertical side handles with a tall neck and flaring rim. The Incans often would place animal heads on their pottery as well usually near the top of the vessel. There were also several other popular styles for Incan ceramics which included a shallow dish with a single bird head and handle, a pedestal beaker and a single or double handled bottle.

Incans often decorated their ceramics with a multitude of images and colors. They usually decorated their pottery with bright colors like red, yellow, orange, black and white. Much like all other forms of Incan art, the pottery was often decorated with geometric shapes. The Incans would put diamonds, squares, checkers, triangles, circles and dots on almost all of their ceramic work. Other common themes were animals and insects like llamas, birds, jaguars, alpacas, bees and butterflies as well as block-like humans.

As part of a tax obligation to the commoners, mining was required in all the provinces. Even though the Inca Empire contained a lot of precious metals, the Incans did not value their metal as much as fine cloth.  The Incans adopted much of their metal-working characteristics from the metalwork of Chimu. Because of their expertise in metalworking, after the fall of Chimu many metalworkers were taken back to the capital city of Cuzco to continue their metalworking for the emperor. Copper, tin, gold and silver were all obtained from mines or washed from the river gravels. These metals would then be handed over to metallurgists. Because the Inca had a system that emphasized political and religious organizations, there were many specialized artisans like metallurgists. There were also: specialized weavers, cloth makers, pottery makers and many more. Both copper and bronze would be used for basic farming tools or weapons. Some of the common bronze and copper pieces found in the Incan empire included sharp sticks for digging, club-heads, knives with curved blades, axes, chisels, needles and pins. All of these items would be forged by a metallurgist and then spread throughout the empire.

The Incans reserved their more precious metals for ornaments and decorations. Gold and silver were common themes throughout the palaces of Incan emperors. It was said that the walls and thrones were covered with gold and that the emperor dined on gold and silver service. These golden plated services would often be inlaid with llamas, butterflies or other creatures. Even beyond the gold and decoration of the emperor’s palace were the ornaments that decorated all of the temples throughout the empire. The temples of the Incans were strewn with sacred and highly precious objects. Headdresses, crowns, ceremonial knives, cups and a lot of ceremonial clothing were all inlaid with gold or silver.

Many historians believe that the choice of gold was to distinguish the more “sacred” or “holy” pieces from others. The commonality of gold has much to do with the Incan religion surrounding the sun. Because of the beautiful reflection that gold casts, it gave the appearance of containing the sun, making the precious metal even more valued in a sun-obsessed society. Gold was reserved for the highest class of Incan society which consisted of priests, lords and, of course, the Sapa Inca.

Politics

Inca government is generally seen as an omnipotent emperor that ruled over a bureaucracy made up of local elites who had been recruited to serve in the state. This style of rule is often credited to Cuzco's success.

The Inca empire was adamant about expansion and did so through two imperialism strategies: territorial administration and indirect-hegemonic control. Territorial administration consisted of a complete take over of provinces by reorganizing the economy through increased agricultural production and control of exchange routes via the Incan road system. The territorial administration allowed the Inca empire to put in a great deal of effort to control a new territory in hopes to strengthen the empire by a flow of surplus goods back to the empire core from the overtaken province. Indirect-hegemonic control enabled the Incas to gain control over a province but would allow the local leaders to govern the province. The reason behind this strategy was to gain land and flow of surplus goods back to the empire core without spending a great deal of effort to overtake and govern.

Imperial rule was sustained through enforcement by Incan rulers and military troops on a random basis, as well as education of the provincial elite youth of the Incan way of life. Temples and shrines were also constructed in overtaken provinces to inflict Incan religion upon provincial peoples.

Education

Religion

The belief system of the Incas was polytheistic. Viracocha, the creator of the universe and Inti, the Sun God, were the most important gods. Viracocha was believed to have created humanity on an island in the middle of Lake Titicaca. Inti was devoutly loved so much that the Inca people called themselves "Intip Churin" which in Quechua means "the children of the sun."

The Inca took part in spiritual human sacrifices known as the Capacocha. These sacrifices were taken out onto mountains throughout the Andes and placed alive into burial tombs where they were left with items such as:figurines, coca leaves, food, alcoholic beverages and pottery. These offerings were carried out on large mountains where ceremonial sites were constructed and were believed to have been made for numerous events such as important festivals, natural phenomenon and efforts to please the mountain deities. The Vilca camayos were the overseers of the offerings, in which they had a decision on where the sacrifices were made and the number of sacrifices made on each mountain. Mountain deities were worshiped because it was believed that they controlled things like rainfall, water flow and, therefore, the abundance and fertility of crops.

Other practices
The Inca practiced cranial deformation. They achieved this by wrapping tight cloth straps around the heads of newborns to alter the shape of their still-soft skulls. These deformations did not result in brain damage. Researchers at the Field Museum believe that the practice was used to mark different ethnicities across the Inca Empire.

The Inca preserved bodies through mummification. Bodies were wrapped in the fetal position in cloth or leather. Rank determined how the Incas were buried. Common people were placed in an open cave or chullpa for possible visiting. Emperors' organs were removed and placed in jars separate from their bodies. After preparation, they were placed where they most occupied in life.

Agriculture 

It is estimated that the Inca cultivated around seventy crop species. The main crops were:potatoes, sweet potatoes, maize, chili peppers, cotton, tomatoes, peanuts, an edible root called oca and the pseudograins quinoa and amaranth. The crops developed by the Inca and preceding cultures makes South America one of the historic centers of crop diversity (along with:the Middle East, India, Mesoamerica, Ethiopia and the Far East). Many of these crops were widely distributed by the Spanish and are now important crops worldwide. Salsa was originated by the Inca people using tomatoes, chili peppers and other spices.
In the Incan settlement of Vitcos, pollen from corn and quinoa was found in several soil samples which date back as early as the Incan period.

The Inca cultivated food crops on dry Pacific coastlines, high on the slopes of the Andes and in the lowland Amazon rainforest. In mountainous Andean environments, they made extensive use of terraced fields which not only allowed them to put to use the mineral-rich mountain soil which other peoples left fallow but also took advantage of micro-climates conducive to a variety of crops being cultivated throughout the year. A contributing factor for the ability of the Inca to expand their population and agriculture as quick as they did, was because of a small climate shift that allowed for slightly warmer temperatures and a small increase in annual precipitation. This contributed to the Inca's ability to use terraced and irrigated fields in higher elevations, opening up vast amount of the Andes Mountains for Inca agriculture. Agricultural tools consisted mostly of simple digging sticks. 

The Inca developed Qollqas, a building made of:adobe, field stone, clay mortar, plaster and pirca" used for food storage. These granaries stored:corn, quinoa, tomatoes, potatoes, chicha (maize beer), fruit, salt, fish, tubers and grain". Qollqas allowed for the survival of food supplies in the cold climate of the Andes.

The Inca also raised llamas and alpacas for their wool, meat and to use them as pack animals and captured wild vicuñas for their fine hair.

The Inca road system was key to farming success as it allowed the distribution of foods over long distances. The Inca also constructed vast storehouses, which allowed them to live through El Niño years while some neighboring civilizations suffered.

Inca leaders kept records of what each ayllu in the empire produced but did not tax them on their production. They instead used the mita for the support of the empire.

The Inca diet consisted primarily of fish and vegetables, supplemented less frequently with the meat of cuyes (guinea pigs) and camelids. In addition, they hunted various animals for meat, skins and feathers.  Maize was malted and used to make chicha, a fermented alcoholic beverage.

Economy 

According to Ferreira and Chamot:
"The social system of the Incas had an ancient Andean origin based on the ayllu, an extended family group with a common ancestor. The economic system was also based on ancient social structures and can be explained through several principles, namely reciprocity, redistribution, and vertical control."

These authors also add:
"Redistribution, a practice employed by the state, ensured that all agricultural goods not exchanged by reciprocity were to be distributed in the different areas of the empire in the case of bad crops."

In essence, the Inca government functioned as a safeguard against mass starvation.

Unlike the Europeans, gold and silver were not used as a form of currency. Instead, clothing and food were distributed by the rulers in exchange for labor.

The Incan required tribute from those they conquered. Historical records show that agricultural production as well as cloth production increased after the Incan conquest.

Infrastructure
The "Qhapaq Ñan" (Inca Road) was largely used and constructed across the Inca Empire. Uses were not only for nobility to spread information and expand the empire but were also used for soldiers, for transportation of goods and private usage. Not only were Incan roads expansive, but they were also well planned and maintained. The Incans made a standard design for the roads and carried out the standard throughout the empire. Roads were built so that they were easily drained to prevent damage to the roads and flooding. The roads were cleaned often by designated maintenance workers. Lodges for traveling nobles were also constructed alongside the roads. Rest stops called tambos were built close to roads with water supplies leading to each so that travelers and messengers could have a place to rest and clean water to drink. Military storehouses were also built near the roads and kept food for when troops were traveling. Bridges were built across rivers that were too deep to cross and large flat stones were placed along the sides of roads as markers to distinguish different sections of the roads.

The Inca relied on and worshiped water heavily. A temple was built, the Incamisana, to worship water and the deities granting them water. The temple, as well as many other buildings constructed by the Inca, incorporated aesthetics, underground water conduits and hydraulic systems. The Inca understood water was needed for agricultural production (used in terraces) and for domestic purposes. The civil engineers of the time for the Inca were tasked with laying out diversion and canal routes to a designated spot, finding what water source would give the desired flow rate and what elevation the water source would need to be tapped from for gravity to work effectively. Sanitation was also well known by the Inca. The Inca had their own wastewater treatment systems and it is documented that they would collect the human waste to perform land application to help ensure successful harvest seasons.

References

External links
 Inca Architecture